Judah Leib Ben-Ze'ev (18 August 176412 March 1811) was a Galician Jewish philologist, lexicographer, and Biblical scholar. He was a member of the Me'assefim group of Hebrew writers, and a "forceful proponent of revitalizing the Hebrew language".

Biography
Judah Leib Ben-Ze'ev was born in the Galician town of Lelov and received a traditional Jewish education. He was married off at the age of 13 and settled in the home of his wife's parents in Krakow, where he spent his days studying Talmud and his nights in clandestinely acquiring the knowledge of Hebrew philology and of secular subjects. In 1787 he moved to Berlin, then the centre of the Haskalah movement. There, he supported himself by teaching Hebrew and began publishing poems and parables in the Hebrew press. Ben-Ze'ev became friends with the Me'assefim and contributed to their journal poems and fables signed "Y. L. K." (Yehuda Leib Krakow).

In 1790 Ben-Ze'ev took up residence in Breslau, where he wrote and published his Hebrew grammar, Talmud lashon ʻIvri, in 1796. Two years later he published his Hebrew translation from Syriac of the apocryphal Book of Sirach, called by Franz Delitzsch a "masterpiece of imitation of Biblical gnomic style", followed by a translation from Greek of the Book of Judith. Ben-Ze'ev returned from Breslau to Krakow and in 1799 formally divorced his wife, with whom he had one daughter.

Work

Prose
Ben-Ze'ev is considered the first to systematize, in the Hebrew language itself, Hebrew grammar, to arrange it methodically and to introduce logic, syntax, and prosody as part of grammatical studies. His grammar Talmud lashon ʻIvri served as the main source for the study of Hebrew in Eastern Europe for a hundred years. The work is divided into five parts, each prefaced with a poem in praise of the Hebrew language, and includes a ma'amar on the difference between thought and speech. It was republished with additions, annotations, and commentaries no less than twenty times. Most notable is the Vilna edition of 1874, with the commentary "Yitron le-Adam" by Avraham Ber Lebensohn.  The first part of a German revision of his Talmud by Salomon Jacob Cohen appeared in Berlin in 1802, and three parts in Dessau in 1807.

His second-most popular work was the Otzar ha-shorashim, a lexicon of Hebrew roots and Hebrew-German dictionary, inspired by the work of David Kimḥi. First published in Vienna between 1806 and 1808, the book went through six editions up to 1880. Ben-Ze'ev's Mesillat ha-limmud, a grammatical work for school-age children, was translated into Italian by Leon Romani (Vienna, 1825) and into Russian by Abraham Jacob Paperna (Warsaw, 1871).

Ben-Ze'ev released new editions and commentaries to the Saadia Gaon's Sefer ha-emunot ve-ha-de'ot (Berlin, 1789) and Yedidya ha-Penini's Beḥinat ha-'Olam (1789). His last major work was Mavo el mikraʼe kodesh (Vienna, 1810), an anthology of historical-critical introductions to each of the books of the Prophets and Hagiographa. The Mavo adopts some of the critical theories of Johann Gottfried Eichhorn.

Poetry
Ben-Ze'ev was the author of Melitzah le-Purim, a collection of mock prayers and seliḥot for Purim, which was often published with Kalonymus ben Kalonymus' celebrated Talmudical parody Masekhet Purim. In 1810, he released a poem in honour of the marriage of Napoleon and Marie Louise, Duchess of Parma. Ben-Ze'ev also composed the earliest-known Hebrew erotic poems in the modern era, which circulated widely in manuscript form but were not published until the 20th century.

Criticism
While well regarded in Maskilic circles, Ben-Ze'ev was the subject of bitter denunciation from many traditionalists because of his heterodox Enlightenment activities. Rumours circulated of the writer having died on the toilet as divine punishment for editing the Talmud lashon ʻIvri on the Sabbath.

Partial bibliography

External links

 Ma'oz Tzur le-Purim ('Ma'oz Tzur for Purim'), attributed to Judah Leib Ben-Ze'ev

References
 

1764 births
1811 deaths
18th-century Jewish biblical scholars
18th-century lexicographers
18th-century linguists
19th-century Jewish biblical scholars
19th-century lexicographers
19th-century linguists
Grammarians of Hebrew
Hebrew-language poets
Jews from Galicia (Eastern Europe)
Polish parodists
Polish Hebraists
Polish lexicographers
Translators from Aramaic
Translators from Greek
Translators from Syriac
Translators to Hebrew
Translators to Yiddish
People of the Haskalah
18th-century translators